Out (also known as Deadly Drifter) is a 1982 satirical drama film directed by Eli Hollander. The film is based on Ronald Sukenick's 1973 novel Out. It stars Peter Coyote, O-Lan Jones, and Danny Glover. The movie tells the tale of Rex (Coyote) roaming the U.S. doing various assignments for a mysterious group of "urban guerrillas" they call "Our Friends". In each meeting the person or persons designated "It" carries a hidden stick of dynamite. Director Eli Hollander summarizes the film, "A subtitle of it could be 'From Yippie to Yuppie'. And the '80s are certainly the age of yuppies. The film does kind of chronicle the history of the transformation from the '60s into the '80s."

Synopsis
The film is about a team, known as "Our Friends", searching for the "Old Man", who is dying. Their trip across the U.S. takes many twists and turns along the way, as is depicted through the eyes of the main character, Rex/Harrold, who ultimately questions society. Whales are part of his ultimate revelation.

Structure
The film is structured in a 10 part journey/road film across America from the East to the West. The characters appear and disappear, morphing into other personalities and often using lines from previous scenes, thus the film, though linear, is a cyclic story. The movie was immortalized by O-Lan Jones's heartrending lines "allow simmer" and "you can't have the schleung".

Cast
 Peter Coyote as Rex
 O-Lan Shepard as Nixie / Dinah
 Jim Haynie as Carl / Tommy / Optometrist
 Grandfather Semu Haute as Empty Fox
 Scott Beach as Sailor
 Danny Glover as Jojo / Roland
 Michael Grodenchik as Arnold / Boy
 Gail Dartez as Trixie / Girl

References

External links
 
 
 
 "Out in Plain Sight", Brett Taylor, Paracinema #11, December 2011.

1982 films
American independent films
Films based on American novels
Troma Entertainment films
1980s English-language films
1980s American films